This is the results breakdown of the local elections held in the Balearic Islands on 13 June 1999. The following tables show detailed results in the autonomous community's most populous municipalities, sorted alphabetically.

Overall

City control
The following table lists party control in the most populous municipalities, including provincial capitals (shown in bold). Gains for a party are displayed with the cell's background shaded in that party's colour.

Municipalities

Calvià

Ciutadella de Menorca
Population: 21,785

Ibiza
Population: 31,582

Inca
Population: 21,103

Llucmajor
Population: 21,771

Manacor
Population: 30,177

Maó-Mahón
Population: 22,358

Palma de Mallorca
Population: 319,181

Santa Eulària des Riu
Population: 20,306

See also
1999 Balearic regional election

References

Balearic Islands
1999